Great to Be Alive may refer to:
 Great to Be Alive!, a theatrical musical, composed by Abraham Ellstein and Robert Russell Bennett
 "Great to Be Alive", a song by Kottonmouth Kings from Sunrise Sessions
 It's Great To Be Alive!, a 2015 live album by Drive-By Truckers

See also
It's Great to Be Alive (disambiguation)
 Good to Be Alive (disambiguation)
 "Doesn't It Feel Great to Be Alive", a song by Vinson Valega